Thea L. James is an American emergency medical physician as well as an Associate Professor, Associate Chief Medical Officer, and Vice President of the Mission at the Boston Medical Center in Boston, Massachusetts.

She serves as Director of the Violence Intervention Advocacy Program, and was Supervising Medical Officer on the Boston Disaster Medical Assistance Team under the department of Health and Human Services.

Early life and education 
James was born in Alexandria, Virginia. In 1987, she pursued her medical degree at Georgetown University School of Medicine. After completing her medical degree in 1991, she moved to Boston to pursue a residency in emergency medicine at Boston City Hospital affiliated with Boston University School of Medicine. James became the Chief Resident of emergency medicine during her residency. Having grown up just outside of Washington, D.C., James was acutely aware of the positive impact the federal government could have as an economic anchor by providing jobs for people in a specific geographic area. The knowledge that an entity could anchor a community, and that this economic anchoring could translate to health in the community, gave James the knowledge and awareness of how to best support communities in Boston. James completed her residency in 1995 and stayed at Boston University for the rest of her career.

Career
After her residency, James began practicing emergency medicine at Boston Medical Center in Boston, Massachusetts. She became an Associate Professor of Emergency Medicine and later the President of the Medical and Dental Staff from 2010 to 2012. In 2015, James was appointed Vice President of Mission at Boston Medical Center. With a critical focus on establishing equity for patients and communities, James also became an Assistant Dean of Diversity and Multicultural Affairs at the Boston University School of Medicine. Her goal was to move away from short-term, "downstream" solutions toward long-term, "upstream" solutions more likely to foster autonomy and economic stability.

James has extensively focused on addressing violence and trauma in communities. She is the co-founder and Director of the Violence Intervention Advocacy Program at Boston Medical Center to provide trauma informed care. She started this program in 2006  based in the emergency room, and her experiences highlighted the need to address factors upstream of the emergency room in order to alter the quality of life-course that in turn prevents violence and trauma in her patients. For her work in addressing community violence, James was appointed by the Obama Administration to serve on the National Task Force on Children Exposed to Violence.

As a leader in the medical field, James served as the chair of the Licensing Committee within the Massachusetts Board of Registration in Medicine from 2009 to 2012. She has also served in several leadership positions within the Society for Academic Emergency Medicine (SAEM) and is currently an appointed member of the SAEM Women in Academic Medicine Emergency Task Force.

Global emergency medicine 
James promotes health equity and addresses public health needs in communities beyond the Boston Area. For 20 years, James travelled to Haiti, along with other colleagues in emergency medicine, to build sustainable public health infrastructures through grass-roots community partnerships. As a Supervising Medical Officer on the Boston Disaster Medical Assistance Team under the department of Health and Human Services, James has provided medical support and leadership after several disasters including 9/11, Hurricane Katrina, Bam in Iran, and the earthquake in Port-au-Prince in Haiti. One day after Haiti's earthquake in 2010, James flew down to provide support and leadership alongside her colleagues.  She also co-founded the non-profit Unified for Global Healing and is a member of the Board of Directors of Equal Health. Equal Health works with local partners in Haiti to create strong, sustainable medical and nursing education systems. James partners with colleagues and community organizations with a goal for patients and communities to be able to fully participate in the economy, which leads to the ability to afford housing, healthy food, education and wellness.

Awards and honors 
 2008: David H. Mulligan Award for Public Service
 2011: Attorney General Eric Holder's National Task Force on Children Exposed to Violence, Member
 2012: The Boston Business Journal, Healthcare Hero Award
 2012: Suffolk County District Attorney's Role Model Award
 2014: Schwartz Center, Compassionate Care Award
 2015: The Boston Business Journal, Healthcare Hero Award
 2015: Boston Chamber of Commerce, Pinnacle Award
 2016: Barney L. Simms “Trailblazer” Award by Atlanta Victim Assistance Inc.
 2017: Jerome Klein Award for Physician Excellence
 2019: Massachusetts Public Health Association, Health Equity Champion
 2020: Fenway Health: Dr. Susan M. Love Award

Select works and publications 

  
  
  
 
James T. The Mission of Safety Net Hospitals: Charity or Equity?. J Clin Ethics. 2018;29(3):237‐239.

References

External links
 Thea James at Boston Medical Center
 Thea James at Boston University
 Thea James at Harvard School of Public Health

Year of birth missing (living people)
Living people
American emergency physicians
American women physicians
Georgetown University School of Medicine alumni
African-American physicians
People from Alexandria, Virginia
Boston University faculty
American women academics
21st-century African-American people
21st-century African-American women